CWS may refer to:

Environment 
 Canadian Wildlife Service, part of Environment and Climate Change Canada
 Currumbin Wildlife Sanctuary, Queensland, Australia
 County Wildlife Site, local reserve status

Baseball 
 Chicago White Sox, a Major League Baseball team
 College World Series, the eight-team final phase of the annual NCAA Division I baseball tournament
 Caribbean World Series, a yearly tournament

Cooperatives 
 Church World Service, a cooperative humanitarian ministry
 The Co-operative Group, formerly Co-operative Wholesale Society, a consumer co-operative in the United Kingdom
 Co-operative wholesale society, a form of co-operative federation

Technology 
 Centralne Warsztaty Samochodowe, a Polish pre-war automobile manufacturer
 CWS T-1, the first serially built car manufactured in Poland

 Control Wheel Steering, an autopilot mode where the pilot controls the autopilot through the yoke

 CoolWebSearch, spyware

Military 
 Chemical Warfare Service, a U.S. Army service branch, later known as Chemical Corps
 Commander's Weapon Station, the aiming and firing system for the Commander's machine gun on the M1 Abrams tank

Other 
 Calfrac Well Services, an oilfield servicing company
 Celebrity worship syndrome, an obsessive-addictive disorder in which a person becomes overly involved with the details of a celebrity's personal life

 Christian Worship: Supplement, a hymnal used by the WELS
 Chronic wasting disease, a transmissible disease affecting deer and other cervid animals
 Compressed work schedule

See also
 CWSDPMI, a DOS extender by Charles W. Sandmann